Med kroppen mot jorden is a 1996 Lisa Ekdahl studio album.

Track listing
All song swritten by Lisa Ekdahl.
Inte kan ödet vara så hårt – 4:07
Himlen och jag – 4:02
Små onda djävlar – 3:33
Jag tror han är en ängel – 1:43
En sten i mitt hjärta – 3:36
Skäl att vara motvalls – 1:53
Ur askan i elden – 3:41
Jag har sett en fjäril – 2:39
Hösten – 4:43
Med kroppen mot jorden – 3:08
Att älska är större – 3:13

Contributors
Lisa Ekdahl – song, guitar
Kenny Håkansson – guitar
Bill Öhrström –congas, percussion, harmonica
Patrik Boman – bass
Jörgen Ringqvist – drums
Peter Asplund –trumpet (track 3)
Gunnar Nordén – guitar (track 4, 10), bass (track 8, 10)
Nils Landgren –trombone (track 5)
Christina Wirdegren–cello (track 11)

Charts

References

1996 albums
Lisa Ekdahl albums